The Latvian National Time Trial Championships is a time trial race that takes place inside the Latvian National Cycling Championship, and decides the best cyclist in this type of race.

Multiple winners

Men

Women

Men

Elite

U23

Women

Elite

References

External links
Past winners on cyclingarchives.com

National road cycling championships
Cycle races in Latvia